Valmy Thomas (October 21, 1925 – October 16, 2010) was a Major League Baseball catcher. Thomas was the first Virgin Islander to play in the major leagues; his mother gave birth to Thomas in Santurce, Puerto Rico, because of better medical care available there, returning to their native Saint Croix immediately after his birth. 

His professional career began in 1951; then, after a three-year hiatus, it resumed in 1955 in the Class C Provincial League in the Canadian province of Quebec. In his five-year major league career (1957–61), he played for five different home cities: the New York / San Francisco Giants (1957–1958), Philadelphia Phillies (1959), Baltimore Orioles (1960) and Cleveland Indians (1961). Thomas was one of the original San Francisco Giants, opening the  season as their starting catcher in their first-ever official game on the West Coast. In 252 total MLB games played, he started 182 games behind the plate. He collected 144 hits, with 20 doubles, three triples, 12 home runs and 60 runs batted in. He hit .230 lifetime.

After his major league career, while playing for the Atlanta Crackers of the International League in 1962, Thomas was shot and critically wounded in a dispute over a woman by mortician-musician Cleveland Lyons, who then committed suicide. That season was the last of Thomas' professional career.

Thomas died in Christiansted, Saint Croix, Virgin Islands, at the age of 84.

References

External links

1925 births
2010 deaths
Albuquerque Dukes players
Atlanta Crackers players
Baltimore Orioles players
Cleveland Indians players
Indianapolis Indians players
Jacksonville Suns players
Johnstown Johnnies players
Major League Baseball catchers
Major League Baseball players from Puerto Rico
Major League Baseball players from the United States Virgin Islands
Minneapolis Millers (baseball) players
New York Giants (NL) players
Philadelphia Phillies players
St. Jean Braves players
St. Jean Canadians players
San Diego Padres (minor league) players
San Francisco Giants players
Sportspeople from San Juan, Puerto Rico
Puerto Rican expatriate baseball players in Canada
United States Virgin Islands expatriate baseball players in Canada
Shooting survivors